The June 1924 Anhalt state election was held on 22 June 1924 to elect the 36 members of the Landtag of the Free State of Anhalt.

Results

References 

Anhalt 1
1924 06